state Alaska

Joseph James Thomas, Jr., more commonly known as Joe J. Thomas, is a former Democratic member of the Alaska Senate, representing the D District from 2006 through 2012. He was previously an official with the Laborers' Union Local 942.

On November 6, 2012, Thomas lost his general election bid to John Coghill.

External links

 Project Vote Smart - Senator Joe J. Thomas (AK) profile
 Follow the Money - Joe J. Thomas
 2006 campaign contributions
 Joe Thomas at 100 Years of Alaska's Legislature

1948 births
Democratic Party Alaska state senators
American trade union leaders
Living people
Politicians from Fairbanks, Alaska
University of Alaska regents
West Virginia University alumni
21st-century American politicians